Dobeleit is a German language surname of East Prussian origin. Notable people with the name include:
 Dick Dobeleit (1903–1978), American football player
 Norbert Dobeleit (1964), German television personality and retired athlete

References 

German-language surnames